"Who Said I Would" is a song performed by Phil Collins that was originally recorded for his 1985 album No Jacket Required but was released in 1991 as a single from his live album Serious Hits... Live! in the United States and Japan.

History
Collins originally wrote and recorded the song for the album, No Jacket Required. The live version was released as the sole single from the Serious Hits... Live! album in the United States, reaching number 73 on the Billboard Hot 100.

The original version was later remixed into the 12"ers album.

Music video
A music video of the original version was filmed, for the No Jacket Required home video. It featured Collins playing the song in a concert. The single version also had a music video, of Collins playing the song during his ... But Seriously tour. Only the second video is available on Phil Collins' YouTube channel (and was uploaded here in 2018).

Charts

Credits 
 Phil Collins – lead vocals
 Brad Cole – keyboards
 Daryl Stuermer – guitar
 Leland Sklar – bass
 Chester Thompson – drums
 The Phenix Horns
 Don Myrick – saxophone, sax solo
 Louis Satterfield – trombone
 Harry Kim and Rhamlee Michael Davis – trumpets
 Arnold McCuller, Bridgette Bryant and Fred White – backing vocals

Original version (1985)
Phil Collins – vocals, vocoder, Simmons drums, kalimba, the "odd" keyboard
David Frank – keyboards, Minimoog bass
Daryl Stuermer – guitars
Gary Barnacle – sax solo
The Phenix Horns
Don Myrick – saxophone
Louis Satterfield – trombone
Rhamlee Michael Davis – trumpet
Michael Harris – trumpet

References

1991 singles
Phil Collins songs
Songs written by Phil Collins
Song recordings produced by Hugh Padgham
1990 songs
Atlantic Records singles
Virgin Records singles
Warner Music Group singles
Song recordings produced by Phil Collins
1985 songs
Live singles